The 46th Infantry Regiment was part of the French Army's 10th Infantry Division based in Paris. It saw action during the First World War, particularly during the Argonne offensive, where, in October 1914—along with the rest of the division—it saw heavy fighting and suffered heavy casualties. It took part in the Battle of Vauquois in February the following year, where, the regimental band—playing the Marseillaise for the 46th, 76th, and 89th as they attacked—were among the first to be killed. The regiment's standard bearer was Collignon, a former councillor of state, while its adjutant was Maurice Cazeneuve, tenor of the Opéra-Comique. Both were killed in action at Vauquois. During the Battle of Verdun in May it was commanded by Lieutenant Gustave Cohen.

Following the defeat of Germany in the Second World war, and the division of Berlin, the regiment occupied the city's French zone.

References

Sources
 
 
 
 

Infantry regiments of France